Ubergsmoen is a village in Vegårshei municipality in Agder county, Norway. The village is located at the junction of the Norwegian County Road 414 and Norwegian County Road 415. The lake Ubergsvann lies just south of the village and the mountain Ubergfjellet lies on the west side of the village.

References

Villages in Agder
Vegårshei